"Alright" is a song by British funk and acid jazz band Jamiroquai, released as the third single from their third studio album, Travelling Without Moving (1996). The song, written by Jamiroquai, contains samples from Eddie Harris' "It's All Right Now" and Idris Muhammad's "Could Heaven Ever Be Like This". "Alright" was released on 28 April 1997 via Sony Soho Square in the United Kingdom, peaking at number six on the UK Singles Chart and at number two in Iceland. It is the group's only single to chart on the US Billboard Hot 100, peaking at number 78. The music video, directed by Vaughan Arnell, features the band performing the song at a party.

Critical reception
In an retrospective review, Justin Chadwick from Albumism named "Alright" the "strongest song" on Travelling Without Moving, describing it as "headnod-inducing" and a "bass-fueled reverie that celebrates the myriad possibilities of newfound love", with a "refreshingly optimistic" Jay Kay proclaiming to the object of his affection". He added, "Without question, it's still my personal favorite, not just from Travelling, but across the band's entire recorded repertoire." Dennis Kelly from The Morning Call felt the band's "mimicking of '70s disco, funk, soul and jazz fusion is well executed" on tracks like "Alright". 

A reviewer from Music Week gave it four out of five, constating that "with its delicious retro funky grooves and pleasing chorus, this latest gem from Travelling Without Moving will land Jay Kay and co with one of their biggest hits to date." Ted Kessler from NME declared it as a "bittersweet" gem, with Kay's "fairy-lit disco". He added further that "We'll spend the night together/Wake up and live forever" is "the epitome of Jay's romantic lyrical vision." Sam Taylor from The Observer remarked its "effortless swank". Aidin Viziri from Salon said the singer "keeps the party alive with unbridled enthusiasm" exploring lust.

Music video
The accompanying music video for "Alright" was directed by British director Vaughan Arnell, and takes place at a luxury party. Jay Kay is filmed singing in an elevator with the rest of Jamiroquai. Then, they perform the song, and at the end of the clip, the crowd were singing the chorus taken from live footage in Argentina. The video starts as a sequel of "Cosmic Girl", with Jamiroquai appearing in sports cars, and Kay was driving the same Lamborghini while parking it at the entrance of the party. It was later published on Jamiroquai's official YouTube channel in 2009, and had generated more than 23 million views as of January 2023.

Track listings
 UK CD1
 "Alright" (radio edit) – 3:40
 "Alright" (version – vocal) – 6:04
 "Alright" (dub – vocal) – 5:34
 "Alright" (D.J. – Version Excursion) – 6:47

 UK CD2
 "Alright" (full-length version) – 4:23
 "Alright" (Tee's in House Mix) – 7:20
 "Alright" (Tee's Digital Club) – 7:15
 "Alright" (Tee's Radio Jay) – 3:27

 2006 digital EP
 "Alright" (Fred Falke & Alan Braxe Remix) – 6:10
 "Alright" (Todd Terry's in House Remix) – 7:20

Charts

Weekly charts

Year-end charts

Release history

References

1996 songs
1997 singles
Jamiroquai songs
Music videos directed by Vaughan Arnell
S2 Records singles
Songs written by Jason Kay
Songs written by Toby Smith